Eleanor Merry (17 December 1873 in Eton, Berkshire, UK – 16 June 1956 in Frinton-on-Sea, Essex, UK), was an English poet, artist, musician and anthroposophist with a strong Celtic impulse and interest in esoteric wisdom. She studied in Vienna and met Rudolf Steiner in 1922 after becoming interested in his teachings. She went on to organize Summer Schools at which Steiner gave important lectures, and was secretary for the World Conference on Spiritual Science in London in 1928.

Biography

Early years and marriage
Eleanor Charlotte Kynaston grew up in a liberal educational environment, her father being the well known classical scholar and professor of Ancient Greek, Herbert Snow aka Kynaston. It was only at the age of 13 that she began to attend a regular school. This was also when she began to take a passionate interest in music. Two years later, her father became Deacon of Durham, so Eleanor grew up close to the beautiful cathedral. She was able to read the manuscripts that were kept in the monastic library, walking up and down amongst the Norman columns of the cathedral and experienced something of a real, concrete history, something completely different from what she read in her schoolbooks. It was the myths and legends that captivated her, and she learned by heart Tennyson’s King Arthur. The stream of scholars and theologians that entered their house fed her spiritual longings.

As she grew up, she sought a career as singer, wanting to study music and art. At 19, she left home for a course of study in Vienna, which led not only to a fine command of the German language and development of her musical skills but also placed her in a kind of artistic-aesthetic inner crisis. Soon after her return to England, she married the well-known Oxford surgeon Merry, to whose professional commitments Eleanor Merry was to devote much of her energy besides the rearing of their son and daughter.

She learnt about Theosophy at the beginning of World War I when a copy of the "Secret Doctrine" of H.P. Blavatsky was sent her by persons unknown. As she read it, she felt as if guided by some unseen hand, and studied further works of Annie Besant and other Theosophists. After the war, she was made aware of Rudolf Steiner’s Knowledge of the Higher Worlds. In January 1922 she met Daniel Nicol Dunlop in London for the first time. He was reading a lecture of Rudolf Steiner’s to the anthroposophical group there. A few months later, her husband died of pneumonia, after which she had her first personal conversation with DN Dunlop. Dunlop was still fired up with gratitude over his meeting with Rudolf Steiner some few weeks previously.

Meeting with Rudolf Steiner

She thereupon took part in the conference "Spiritual Values in Education" in Oxford that August, where she met Rudolf Steiner personally for the first time. She saw him first in a corridor and by his gait and the manner in which he looked at her, she had the impression: "He knows where he is going."

She assisted D.N. Dunlop in the preparation of the subsequent Summer School in Penmaenmawr the following year, where a further conversation with Rudolf Steiner took place in which he recommended to her the new techniques in painting that had been developed under his guidance. She was soon exhibiting publicly in London and elsewhere. He also advised her to form as strong a bond as possible with Dunlop. This summer school, devoted to the theme "The Evolution of Consciousness" was felt by Steiner to be a milestone in the development of the anthroposophical movement.

Eleanor was present at the founding of the new General Anthroposophical Society at the Goetheanum in Dornach, Switzerland around New Year 1923/24. It is likely that the theme of the ensuing Summer School at Torquay in 1924, "True and False Paths in Spiritual Investigation" (GA 243). stemmed from a conversation she had with Rudolf Steiner on this occasion.

Later years
In her further work in Britain after Rudolf Steiner’s death, she wholeheartedly supported D.N. Dunlop’s efforts to create an open, inclusive and at the same time spiritually founded continuation of the anthroposophical work. She acted as secretary of the anthroposophical World Conference in London of 1928 and wrote a play around the figure of King Arthur for the youth conference initiated by David Clement in Glastonbury in 1932. More immediately than anyone, she experienced the dramatic events affecting Daniel Dunlop between 1929, when he became General Secretary of the Anthroposophical Society in Great Britain and the spring of 1935, when he was expelled from the General Anthroposophical Society and died a short while later. After his death, she maintained intimate friendships with her half-sister, Marna Pease, Walter Johannes Stein and particularly Eugen Kolisko, whom she helped to build up the School for Spiritual Science, wrote numerous articles for their magazine "The Modern Mystic", and wrote down the biographical notes Kolisko dictated to her. In the 1940s she led a painting school together with Maria Schindler as well as working with her on the book Pure Colour (1946), leading to large public exhibitions.

Eleanor Charlotte Merry died on 16. June 1956 in Frinton-on-Sea, Essex.

Published work
 Pure Colour by Maria Schindler and Eleanor C. Merry. New Culture Publications, 1946. ASIN B0060DEF66
 The Flaming Door: The Mission of the Celtic Folk-soul Floris Books (20 Mar 2008) 
 The Ascent of Man Floris Books; 3rd Revised edition (20 Mar 2008) 
 Easter: The Legends and the Facts Floris Books; 2nd Revised edition (20 Mar 2008) 
 Art: Its Occult Basis and Healing Value New Knowledge Books (1961) ASIN B0000CL9L9
 Remembered Gods and Other Poems Rudolf Steiner Press (Dec 1954) 
 A Man a Maiden and a Tree, A Christmas Mystery-Play Founded on the Medieval English Mystery-Cycles Eleanor Merry with Isabel Wyatt.  The Michael Press; First Edition (1986) ASIN B0055IA3WM
 Spiritual Knowledge New Knowledge Books (Dec 1988) 
 The Ascent of Man New Knowledge Books (1963) ASIN B0000CM9AB
 Spiritual knowledge: The reality and its shadow New Knowledge 1st ed. (1966) ASIN B0000CO9WG
 I Am: the Ascent of Mankind Rider & Co.; 1st edition (1944) ASIN B0014UW70G
 The Dream Song of Olaf Asteson New Knowledge Books; First Edition (1961) ASIN B0032Q4CJO
 The Year and its Festivals, from the standpoint of natural human thought and experience Anthroposophical Publishing Co (1952) ASIN B0000CIAEV
 Odrun: The Rune of the Depths: Given in Dramatic Pictures The Orient-Occident Publishing Co.; First edition (1928) ASIN B0057FKSS2

References

1873 births
1956 deaths
Anthroposophists
English women poets
20th-century English painters